Al-Taliya Club is an Omani sports club based in Sur, Oman. The club is mainly known for its football team, which is currently playing in the Oman First Division League of Oman Football Association, and is also operating teams in other sports, such as hockey, volleyball, handball, basketball, badminton and squash.

Their home ground is Sur Sports Complex. The stadium is government owned, but they also own their own personal stadium and sports equipment, as well as their own training facilities. The club also operate a youth football team which competes in the Omani Youth league.

Colors, kit providers and sponsors
Al-Taliya SC have been known since establishment to wear a full orange (with black shorts) or black (with orange shorts) (Away) kit, varying themselves from neighbors Al-Oruba SC (white) and Sur SC (blue) kits. They have also had many different sponsors over the years.

Honours and achievements

National titles
Sultan Qaboos Cup (1):
Winners 1974

References

External links
Al-Taleea SC Profile at Soccerway.com
Al-Taliya SC Profile at Goalzz.com

Football clubs in Oman
Omani League
Sur, Oman
Association football clubs established in 1962
1962 establishments in Oman